Jean Dacquay (17 December 1927 – 28 November 2014) was a French racing cyclist. He rode in the 1953 Tour de France.

References

External links
 

1927 births
2014 deaths
French male cyclists